Cromwell's Run Rural Historic District is a national historic district located near Rectortown, Fauquier County, Virginia. The district encompasses 384 contributing buildings, 20 contributing sites, and 36 contributing structures.  It includes the separately listed Atoka Historic District and Rectortown Historic District.

It was listed on the National Register of Historic Places in 2008, with a boundary increase the same year.

References

Historic districts in Fauquier County, Virginia
National Register of Historic Places in Fauquier County, Virginia
Historic districts on the National Register of Historic Places in Virginia